The 2011 Copa Claro Doubles was a men's tennis tournament played on outdoor clay courts in Copa Claro, Argentina.

Sebastián Prieto and Horacio Zeballos were the defending champions, but decided not to participate.
Oliver Marach and Leonardo Mayer defeated Franco Ferreiro and André Sá 7–6(6), 6–3 in the final.

Seeds

Draw

Draw

External links
 Main Draw

Copa Claro - Doubles
2011 - Doubles